John Elwes may refer to:
John Elwes (tenor) (born 1946), English tenor singer
John Elwes (politician) (1714–1789), English Member of Parliament and miser
John Payne Elwes, British Member of Parliament for North Essex

See also
Elwes